Nilton 'Niltinho' Rossoni (Curitiba, April 21, 1981) is a former Brazilian racing driver who won the 2000 Barber Dodge Pro Series championship.

Racing career

After winning karting championships in the Paraná and São Paulo regions the young driver graduated into single-seaters in 1997. The sixteen-year-old raced in the Formula Chevrolet Brazil, a support series to the highly popular Stock Car Brasil. He won the rookie of the year title in his inaugural season. Near the end of the racing season the Brazilian made his debut in the Barber Dodge Pro Series. He qualified twelfth out of 27 but had to retire after one lap due to a clutch failure. He returned the following year winning races at Road America and Homestead-Miami Speedway finishing sixth in the standings. The 1999 season was a season in which Rossoni failed to finish six times. At Homestead-Miami Speedway the Brazilian won pole-position but had to retire due to a mechanical issue. The young driver got his revenge in the 2000 season of the Barber Dodge Pro Series. Rossoni won six out of twelve races. Before the final round only Jon Fogarty had a mathematical chance to win the championship. Rossoni won his title in style by winning the final round of the season. After his success the Brazilian graduated into the Indy Lights. But as the economic crisis hit Brazil, his longtime sponsor Fox Distribuidora de Petróleo (owned by the Rossoni family) almost went bankrupt. Rossoni could only compete one race, at Fundidora park supporting the Tecate/Telmex Grand Prix of Monterrey. His weekend started well as he qualified in second place. Rossoni had a poor start of the race as he was passed by Townsend Bell and passed the finish line in seventh place after the first lap. Rossoni failed to finish as he wrecked his car after four laps. After his nightmare 2001 season Rossoni decided to return to the Barber Dodge Pro Series in 2002 for two races. After two fourth place finishes he retired from professional racing.

Motorsports results

American Open-Wheel racing results
(key) (Races in bold indicate pole position, races in italics indicate fastest race lap)

Barber Dodge Pro Series

Indy Lights

References

1981 births
Brazilian racing drivers
Brazilian people of Italian descent
Barber Pro Series drivers
Indy Lights drivers
Sportspeople from Curitiba
Living people
Conquest Racing drivers